Sins of the Fathers is a 1928 American part-talkie drama film produced by Famous Players-Lasky and released by Paramount Pictures. It was also issued in a silent version for theaters which were not yet wired for sound. The film was directed by Ludwig Berger and stars Emil Jannings and Ruth Chatterton in her motion picture debut.

Cast
Emil Jannings as Wilhelm Spengler
Ruth Chatterton as Greta Blake
Barry Norton as Tom Spengler
Jean Arthur as Mary Spengler
Jack Luden as Otto Schmidt
ZaSu Pitts as Mother Spengler
Matthew Betz as Gus Newman
Harry Cording as The Hijacker
Arthur Housman as The Count
Frank Reicher as The Eye Specialist
Douglas Haig as Tom, as a child
Dawn O'Day (later known as Anne Shirley) as Mary, as a child
Milla Davenport as Bit Part (uncredited)
Speed Webb and His Orchestra (uncredited)

Survival status
It has been reported that a print of Sins of the Fathers survives. Some promotional or Coming Attraction material is held by the Library of Congress and excerpts are preserved at the UCLA Film and Television Archive.

References

External links

Still #1 and #2 at gettyimages.com

1928 films
American silent feature films
Films directed by Ludwig Berger
Famous Players-Lasky films
1928 drama films
American black-and-white films
Silent American drama films
Films about prohibition in the United States
1920s American films